General elections were held in American Samoa on 6 November 2012 to elect a new governor and lieutenant governor, twenty members of the American Samoa House of Representatives and the Delegate to United States House of Representatives. Incumbent governor Togiola Tulafono was term-limited and could not seek re-election.

Lolo Matalasi Moliga was elected governor, while Eni Faleomavaega was re-elected as the U.S. House delegate.

Gubernatorial election
The incumbent, Governor Togiola Tulafono, who had held office since 2003, was term-limited and could not seek re-election. Tulafono, who took office after the death of former governor Tauese Sunia, was elected to his first four-year term in 2004 and re-elected in the 2008 gubernatorial election.

All elections and candidates in American Samoa are nonpartisan, though Faoa Aitofele Sunia is affiliated with the Democratic Party. Slightly less than 17,000 American Samoans were eligible to vote in the 2012 election.

Candidates
Six candidates sought election as the next Governor of American Samoa in 2012. Governor Togiola Tulafono was term-limited and could not seek a third consecutive term.

 Salu Hunkin-Finau, educator and former president of the American Samoa Community College. Only female candidate for governor.
Running mate: Iuniasolua Savusa, former Command Sergeant Major in the United States Army
 Timothy Jones, businessman
Running mate: Tuika Tuika, government official and candidate for governor in 2008
 Afoa Moega Lutu, High Chief of Utulei, former attorney general, and candidate for governor in 2008
Running mate: Le'i Sonny Thompson, director of the Department of Administrative Services
 Lolo Letalu Matalasi Moliga, president of the Development Bank of American Samoa
Running mate: Lemanu Peleti Mauga, territorial Senator
 Faoa Aitofele Sunia, Lieutenant Governor of American Samoa since 2003, affiliated with the Democratic Party 
Running mate: Taufete'e John Faumuina, Jr., former director of Economic Development
 Save Liuato Afa Tuitele, former judge of the High Court of American Samoa
Running mate: Tofoitaufa Sandra King-Young, founder and CEO of the Pacific Islands Center for Educational Development

Withdrawn candidates
Utu Abe Malae, director of the Northern Marianas Commonwealth Utility Corporation and second placed candidate in 2008 gubernatorial election; announced candidacy on August 15, 2011, withdrew on October 10, 2011

Controversy
The gubernatorial ticket of Save Liuato Tuitele and Sandra King-Young filed a petition in September 2012 against four other campaigns questioning their eligibility to run in the election. Tuitele and Young argued that the other four candidates had not resigned from their government jobs before beginning their political campaigns, as required by law. The four candidates challenged by the Tuitele campaign were gubernatorial candidates Lolo Letalu Matalasi Moliga and Salu Hunkin-Finau, as well as lieutenant governor candidates Taufete'e Faumuina Jr. and Le'i Sonny Thompson.

The case was heard by the High Court of American Samoa, which turned down the petition allowing all candidates to remain in the election.

Endorsements
Outgoing Governor Togiola Tulafono endorsed his lieutenant governor, Faoa Aitofele Sunia, for governor in the six-way election.

Referendum
Voters were asked "Should Article II, Sections 9 and 19 of the revised constitution of American Samoa be revised to give the Fono, rather than the Secretary for the U.S. Department of Interior, the power to override the Governors veto?"

The proposal would involve amending two parts of the constitution:

Results

Governor

U.S. House delegate

Referendum

References

 
American Samoa
Referendums in American Samoa
American Samoa gubernatorial elections
American Samoa
Non-partisan elections
2012
American Samoa